A wheelwright is a craftsman who builds or repairs wooden wheels. The word is the combination of "wheel" and the word "wright", (which comes from the Old English word "wryhta", meaning a worker or shaper of wood) as in shipwright and arkwright. This occupational name became the English surname Wright. It also appears in surnames like Cartwright and Wainwright. It corresponds with skilful metal workers being called Smith.

These tradesmen made wheels for carts (cartwheels), wagons (wains), traps and coaches and the belt drives of steam powered machinery.  They also made the wheels, and often the frames, for spinning wheels for home use. First constructing the hub (called the nave), the spokes and the rim segments called felloes, (pronounced fell low), and assembling them all into a unit working from the center of the wheel outwards. Most wheels were made from wood, but other materials have been used, such as bone and horn, for decorative or other purposes. Some earlier construction for wheels such as those used in early chariots were bound by rawhide that would be applied wet and would shrink whilst drying, compressing and binding the woodwork together. After many centuries wheels evolved to be straked with iron, a method of nailing iron plates onto the felloes to protect against wear on the ground and to help bind the wheel together. Straking was considered to be a less skilled practice and could be done with less knowledge and equipment, this made the wheels easier to service without the need for a blacksmith.

Over millennia the overall appearance of the wheel barely changed but subtle changes to the design such as dishing and staggered spokes helped keep up with the demands of a changing world. These small changes in design made a massive improvement to the strength of the wheel whilst reducing its weight; vehicles then became more efficient to build and use.

Industrial age 
During the industrial age, iron strakes were replaced by a solid iron tyre custom made by a blacksmith after the wheelwright had measured each wheel to ensure proper fit. Iron tyres were always made slightly smaller than the wheel in circumference. They were expanded by heating in a fire, and while hot they were hammered, and pulled by a levered hook, onto the rim of the wheel. The hot tyre was then cooled by placing it into water. This shrank it onto the wood, and closed the wooden joints. Tyres were fastened to the wheels with nails, or tyre bolts. The metal tyres were drilled before being placed on the wheel. Tyre-bolts were less likely than tyre-nails to fall off because they were bolted through the felloes. Both countersunk and flush finished to the wheel's outer surface.

During the second half of the 19th century, the use of pre-manufactured iron hubs and other factory-made wood, iron and rubber wheel parts became increasingly common. Companies such as Henry Ford's developed manufacturing processes that soon made the village wheelwright obsolete. With the onset of two world wars, the trade soon went into decline and was very rare by the 1960s and almost extinct by the year 2000. However, owing to the efforts of organisations like the Worshipful Company of Wheelwrights, wheelwrights still continue to operate in the UK.

In modern times, wheelwrights continue to make and repair a wide variety of wheels, including those made from wood and banded by iron tyres. The word wheelwright remains a term usually used for someone who makes and repairs wheels for horse-drawn vehicles, although it is sometimes used to refer to someone who repairs wheels, wheel alignment, rims, drums, discs and wire spokes on modern vehicles such as automobiles, buses and trucks. Wheels for horse-drawn vehicles continue to be constructed and repaired for use by people who use such vehicles for farming, competitions and presentations of historical events such as reenactments and living history.

Wheelwrighting today 
A modern wooden wheel generally consists of three main parts, the nave or hub at the centre of the wheel, the spokes radiating out from the centre and the felloes or rims around the outside. Generally the wheel would be bound by a steel or iron tyre depending on its historical period and purpose.

The main timbers used in a traditional wooden wheel are Elm for the nave, Oak for the spokes and Ash for the felloes although this can vary in some areas depending on availability of timber, climate and style of production. Sometimes Hickory is substituted for Oak and Ash as it is easier to bend for mass production and is quite springy for light wheels that require a bit of flexibility.

The Elm is used for its interwoven grain, this prevents the nave from splitting with the force of the spokes being driven in tight.

The Oak is used because it doesn't bend, compress or flex and transfers any load pressures directly from the felloes to the nave.

The Ash is used for its flexibility and springy nature, this acts as a form of suspension and protects against shock damage.

The future 
In the second half of the 20th century, wheelwright training faded away due to a lack of demand for new wooden wheels. The skills were kept alive by small businesses, museums, societies and trusts such as The Colonial Williamsburg Foundation (USA) and The Countryside Agency (UK).

The Worshipful Company of Wheelwrights in London (UK) maintains a flourishing (government-backed) apprenticeship scheme that began in 2013.

Colonial Williamsburg (USA) has an ongoing apprenticeship program and has recently (2016) taken on new apprentices.

See also 
 Artillery wheel
 Wheelbuilding
 Worshipful Company of Wheelwrights

References

Further reading

External links 
 "An Old Craftman Preserves." Popular Mechanics, October 1947, p. 144-145.
 Worshipful Company of Wheelwrights
 Phill Gregson, Wheelwright
 Worldwide Wheelwright study

Wheels
Industrial occupations
Obsolete occupations
Artisans